Baril Peak is located on the border of Alberta and British Columbia on the Continental Divide. It was named in 1918 after Conrad M.L. Baril, a Dominion surveyor killed in World War I.

The mountain is composed of sedimentary rock laid down during the Precambrian to Jurassic periods. Formed in shallow seas, this sedimentary rock was pushed east and over the top of younger rock during the Laramide orogeny.

See also
List of peaks on the Alberta–British Columbia border
List of mountains of Alberta
Mountains of British Columbia

References

Three-thousanders of Alberta
Three-thousanders of British Columbia
Canadian Rockies